Reloaded is a 2013 compilation album by Swiss singer, songwriter, dancer, and music producer DJ BoBo containing reworked materials of some of his greatest hits.

Six of the 14 tracks on the album are remixed by King & White Mix, another by Swiss DJ and producer David May and one by DJ / producer German duo Bodybangers (Andreas Hinz und Michael Müller). 

The album also has collaborations as well with many established artists including Remady, Manu-L, The Baseballs, Mike Candys, Kim Wilde, Inna and Jessica Folcker, and a final track comprising a megamix of many of his other hits.

Track listing

Charts

References

2013 compilation albums